Cross-country skiing at the 2023 Winter World University Games was held at the Lake Placid Olympic Sports Complex Cross Country Biathlon Center from 15 to 22 January 2023.

Men's events

Women's events

Mixed event

Medal table

Participating nations
A total of 172 atletes (91 men and 81 women) competed from 28 countries.

  (1)
  (1)
  (9)
  (1)
  (12)
  (1)
  (7)
  (3)
  (11)
  (8)
  (11)
  (1)
  (2)
  (8)
  (8)
  (14)
  (3)
  (1)
  (11)
  (7)
  (6)
  (1)
  (6)
  (2)
  (10)
  (2)
  (9)
  (16)

References

External links
Cross-Country Skiing lakeplacid2023.com
Results book

2023 Winter World University Games
 
2023
Winter World University Games